Athaimadi Methaiadi is a 1989 Indian Tamil-language film written and directed by K. S. Gopalakrishnan. The film stars his son K. S. G. Venkatesh (in his acting debut), Pallavi and Ilavarasi. It was released on 15 September 1989.

Plot 

A girl adopts a child on her own, which leads to her family accusing her of giving birth out of wedlock. The rest of the film shows the girl and her lover finding the real parents of the child.

Cast 
K. S. G. Venkatesh
Pallavi
Ilavarasi
Prameela
Senthil
Loose Mohan
S. S. Chandran
Major Sundarrajan
Vennira Aadai Moorthy
Oru Viral Krishna Rao

Soundtrack 
Soundtrack was composed by S. R. Vasu.

Reception 
P. S. S. of Kalki wrote that the director seemed to have been confused about where the story begins, where the story ends, where the direction lies, and how it ends.

References

External links 
 
 

1980s Tamil-language films
1989 films
Films directed by K. S. Gopalakrishnan
Films with screenplays by K. S. Gopalakrishnan